{{DISPLAYTITLE:C17H12O7}}
The molecular formula C17H12O7 may refer to:

 Aflatoxin B1 exo-8,9-epoxide, a toxic metabolite of aflatoxin B1
 Aflatoxin M1, a chemical compound of the aflatoxin class